In Buddhist literature, the sixteen frightening dreams of King Pasenadi (Sanskrit; Pali ) is notable topic of Buddhism and dreamt by the King Pasenadi of Kosala and their Interpretations by the Gautama Buddha.

Buddha used Anāgatam Nyandaw to visualise the nightmares. Then he explained that the nightmares are the terrible things that will happen in the future. When the time reaches after 2500 Sāsanā Years or circa 1957 A.D, the foretold events will take place.
The pictures depicting the sixteen nightmares are found in some pagodas in Myanmar.

The 16 frightening dreams

First dream 
 The four strong oxen, from North, East, South and West, came to fight against one another in front of the king. But when they are about to fight, they retreated instead.

Meaning: "When bad people lead, the dark clouds came to rain, but just thunder instead, thus destroying certain crops and leading people to starve."

Second dream 
 The young plants are bearing fruits.

Meaning: "When people begin to have short lifespan, young people will marry and have kids even when they are below 18 years old."

Third dream 
 The female cow feeds on the milk of her child.

Meaning: "When people stop respecting the elders, the parents will live with their children, for not having anyone to rely on."

Fourth dream 
 A farmer is using young cows for transportation and abandons strong ones.

Meaning: "People will hire young, inexperienced people in certain jobs, especially judging crimes. Not being able to work well, the young people will quit the jobs and old people will not reapply for their previous jobs, which leads to the demise of a country."

Fifth dream 
 The horse with two heads eats wheat from two different containers instead of eating together.

Meaning: Evil judges will take the bribery of both the defendant and the jurors, and they will decide the crimes however they want."

Sixth dream 
 People encourage a wolf to urinate on the golden cup.

Meaning: "Good people will not be respected or praised, thus reducing reputation. So, they have to make friends with bad people for the sake of their reputation."

Seventh dream 
 A man is making threads and places them near his legs. A hungry, female wolf tries to eat the thread without letting him know.

Meaning: "Women will not consider about the money their husbands have tiredly made. They will spend the money for clothes, food, drinks, jewelry and gambling without letting their husbands know."

Eighth dream 
 There is a large pot surrounded with other small pots. Although the large pot is overflowing, people come and pour water only into the large pot and no one pour water into the small pots.

Meaning: "People will experience poverty because of their evil leaders. They have to work hard for their leaders and not for their family which leads to starvation."

Ninth dream 
 Animals drink water from a large lake which is polluted around the centre and clean around the edge.

Meaning: "The future leaders will not be sympathetic to their citizens. They will force the citizens to pay a lot of taxes. Not being able to withstand the heavy tax, they will move to the countryside."

Tenth dream 
 Rice is cooked in a single pot. However, some portions are overcooked, some undercooked and some are cooked right.

Meaning: "It will not rain properly, i.e some areas get a lot of rain while other areas don't. Such a rain destroys certain crops and results in crops of different qualities although they are grown in same field."

Eleventh dream 
 A man buys a valuable ruby with a liquid.

Meaning: "People will spread Buddha's teachings, asking for donations and spend for their own good. This is equivalent to buying the teachings with a few money."

Twelfth dream 
 Dried gourds which usually float on water sank in the water.

Meaning: "Wicked people will get the duties of leading a country and people will start to believe in them."

Thirteenth dream 
 A large rock is floating in water.

Meaning: "When bad people rule, good people couldn't make strong statements in arguments. So, they are no longer appreciated.

Fourteenth dream 
 A female frog tries to eat a large cobra.

Meaning: "Men would marry younger spouses and give them whatever they want. However, the spouses will scold them for lacking decision in certain cases."

Fifteenth dream 
 A crow is surrounded by golden Hamsas.

Meaning: "In the future, only people of bad characteristics will become the leaders. Not having anyone to rely on, good people will have to serve them."

Sixteenth dream 
 Because goats feed on cheetahs, the cheetahs run in fear when they see goats.

Meaning: "When Wicked people became governors, they will claim the land of the good people and deports them. So, good people have to run away from those people."

References

Sources

Buddhist cosmology
Buddhist mythology
Prophecy in Buddhism
Dreams in religion
6th-century BC Buddhism